Sacred Heart of Jesus Parish - designated for Polish immigrants in Easthampton, Massachusetts, United States. It was founded in 1909. It is one of the Polish-American Roman Catholic parishes in New England in the Diocese of Springfield in Massachusetts. It closed in June 2010.

History 
"The Johnny Appleseed" of Polish parishes in western Massachusetts, said Rev. Wladyslaw Kielbasinski, on November 10, 1907, while celebrating Mass in the Easthampton Town Hall, referring to the first parish collection of $9.97, as the beginning of parish fund for the construction of a new church.

November 18, 1909, Rev. John Mard becomes the first Resident Pastor. 
August 31, 1919, the new, Sacred Heart School open to 400 students and 8 Felician Sisters from Enfield, Connecticut.

School 
 Sacred Heart School, Easthampton

References

Bibliography 
 
 The Official Catholic Directory in USA

External links 
  Sacred Heart of Jesus - Diocesan information
 Sacred Heart of Jesus - ParishesOnline.com
 Sacred Heart of Jesus - TheCatholicDirectory.com
 Diocese of Springfield in Massachusetts
 Pastoral planning in Diocese of Springfield in Massachusetts

Roman Catholic parishes of Diocese of Springfield in Massachusetts
Polish-American Roman Catholic parishes in Massachusetts